Juan Miguel Solano is a Spanish actor.

He played Luis in El misterio de la vida (1972), directed by Jaime Jesús Balcázar and starring Mónica Randall, Dominique Simpson and Joaquín Díaz. He appeared in Stagecoach of the Condemned (1970).

Filmography

References

External links
 

Date of birth missing
20th-century Spanish male actors
Spanish male film actors